Desiree van Lunteren (born 30 December 1992) is a former Dutch footballer who played as a right-back or a midfielder.

Club career
van Lunteren began her senior career at Eredivisie team AZ Alkmaar before moving Telstar and later joining Ajax in 2012 to play in the first season of the short-lived BeNe League.

In June 2018, a personal sponsor helped her move to SC Freiburg, departing Ajax after 6 years and 166 matches.

In July 2019, after one season in Germany, van Lunteren returned to Ajax on a two-year contract. After finishing her contract she agreed terms with PSV and ended her career in Eindhoven in 2022.

International career
Van Lunteren was handed her first senior national team cap by coach Roger Reijners on 15 February 2012, in a 2–1 friendly defeat to France in Nîmes.

She was called up to be part of the national team for the 2013. and the 2017 UEFA Women's Euros. At the 2017 tournament, Van Lunteren started 5 of the team's 6 games and helped the team win the tournament. She assisted a goal in the final before being subbed off in the 57th minute.

Van Lunteren was an integral part of the Dutch team that finished second in the 2019 FIFA Women's World Cup in France, playing in every match.

She retired from the national team on 21 November 2019.

Honours

Club
AZ Alkmaar
 Eredivisie: 2009–10
 KNVB Women's Cup: 2010–11

AFC Ajax

 KNVB Women's Cup: 2013–14
 KNVB Women's Cup: 2016–17
 KNVB Women's Cup: 2017–18
Eredivisie: 2016–17
Eredivisie: 2017–18

International
Netherlands
UEFA Women's Euro: 2017
Algarve Cup: 2018

References

External links
 
 Desiree van Lunteren at OnsOranje.nl 
 Under-19 national team profile at OnsOranje.nl 
 Under-17 national team profile at OnsOranje.nl 
 Under-16 national team profile at OnsOranje.nl 
  

1992 births
Living people
Dutch women's footballers
Expatriate footballers in Germany
Netherlands women's international footballers
Eredivisie (women) players
AFC Ajax (women) players
Telstar (women's football club) players
SC Freiburg (women) players
2015 FIFA Women's World Cup players
Women's association football midfielders
Footballers from Almere
AZ Alkmaar (women) players
UEFA Women's Championship-winning players
Knights of the Order of Orange-Nassau
2019 FIFA Women's World Cup players
Dutch expatriate women's footballers
Dutch expatriate sportspeople in Germany
Expatriate women's footballers in Germany
PSV (women) players
UEFA Women's Euro 2017 players
21st-century Dutch women